Cevizpınar is a village in the Gerger District, Adıyaman Province, Turkey. The village is populated by Kurds of non-tribal affiliation and had a population of 331 in 2021.

The hamlet of Doluca is attached to the village.

References

Villages in Gerger District
Kurdish settlements in Adıyaman Province